Emre Belözoğlu  (born 7 September 1980) is a Turkish former professional footballer and manager who is currently serving as the manager of İstanbul Başakşehir. During his playing career, he played as a midfielder. He was named in the FIFA 100, a list of the 125 greatest living footballers as a part of FIFA's centenary celebrations announced by Pelé. Although he was the Fenerbahçe football team captain known for being a Fenerbahçe fan, as a playmaker, his past clubs other than Fenerbahçe include Galatasaray, Inter Milan, Newcastle United, Atlético Madrid and İstanbul Başakşehir. Belözoğlu was a part of the Turkey national team from 2000 to 2019, earning over 100 caps and helping the team to the semi-finals at the 2002 World Cup and at Euro 2008.

Club career

Early years (1990–1996)
Belözoğlu's inspiration came from his father, Mehmet, who introduced him to football at the Zeytinburnuspor training ground. Belözoğlu's mother, Fatma, had seen the problems that her husband had faced through his football career, and thus did not want their son to become a professional football player. His father, however, urged and inspired Belözoğlu to embark on a career.
The fans of Zeytinburnuspor quickly took an interest in him, stating his wonderful control of a left foot. Coach Salih Bulgurlu noticed his talent and started giving him special training. Bulgurlu looked after Belözoğlu for four years, teaching him all the basic techniques, improving and harnessing his fitness and stamina dramatically. Belözoğlu was quickly discovered by former Galatasaray legend Bülent Ünder, a close friend of Galatasaray manager Fatih Terim. Bülent Ünder pleaded to Bulgurlu that Emre join Galatasaray: "Wait and see. In two years, this teenager will be playing proudly within the battlegrounds of Europe."

Galatasaray (1996–2001)
Belözoğlu officially became a Galatasaray player. His first appearance for the club's senior squad was as a sixteen-year-old in the 1996–97 season. The following year, he became a regular in the squad. Once he became a regular he won four Süper Lig titles, two Turkish Cups, one UEFA Cup, and one UEFA Super Cup all by the age of 21. Belözoğlu also played in the quarter-finals of the UEFA Champions League against Real Madrid in April 2001.

Inter Milan (2001–2005)
In 2001, he moved to Inter Milan for £5 million. In the 2002–03 season, Belözoğlu became the 17th winner of the Pirata d'Oro (Golden Pirate), an annual award given for the Inter Milan best player of the year. Inter made it through to the semi-finals of the Champions League that year, and that was as far as Belözoğlu would reach with the club. He gradually became out of favour at Inter due to persistent injuries, and after making just nineteen appearances during the 2004–05 season, he became available for transfer.

Newcastle United (2005–2008)

On 19 July 2005, Belözoğlu moved to Newcastle United on a five-year deal for a £3.8 million transfer fee. He made his debut on 3 August in a 2–1 home defeat to Deportivo La Coruña in the UEFA Intertoto Cup, and 11 days later started in Newcastle's first game of the Premier League season, a defeat to Arsenal. In his fourth game on 23 October, he set up the opening goal with a corner to Shola Ameobi, and later scored the winner with a free kick, in a 3–2 victory over Sunderland in the Tyne-Wear derby. Of 25 games in all competitions in his first season, 20 in the league, he scored just one more goal: a long range shot on 5 November to defeat Birmingham City 1–0.

Injuries limited Belözoğlu to only 35 Premier League appearances in his subsequent two seasons at Newcastle, in which he scored three goals. On 17 January 2008, in an FA Cup replay against Stoke City, he was sent off after 29 minutes for retaliating after being fouled by John Eustace.

Fenerbahçe (2008–2012)
In July 2008, Belözoğlu, was unveiled at the Şükrü Saracoğlu Stadium, the traditional homeground of Fenerbahçe, in a signing ceremony. Fanatical Galatasaray supporters were enraged and started many "anti-Belözoğlu" campaigns for transferring to their rival. However, Belözoğlu stated that he had always been a Fenerbahçe fan, which has been confirmed by some of his past team-mates, including Galatasaray legends Hakan Şükür and Hasan Şaş. After a disappointing first season, consistent performances in the next saw Emre rewarded with the Süper Lig player of the year for the 2009–10 season. He was effective at both ends of the pitch, his experience and combative style proving a valuable asset in taking his team so close in both league and cup. On 3 November 2010, Belözoğlu declared that he hung posters of former Fenerbahçe players Aykut Kocaman, Rıdvan Dilmen and Džoni Novak on his walls at home.

Atlético Madrid (2012–2013)
Belözoğlu moved to Atlético Madrid, the reigning champions of the Europa League on 29 May 2012. He signed a two-year contract and was warmly received by compatriot and midfield partner Arda Turan. On 7 July Belözoğlu trained with his new teammates before being unveiled by Atlético in a signing ceremony held in the Vicente Calderon stadium. He made his Atlético debut on 1 September 2012 in the UEFA Super Cup against Chelsea, coming on for the last three minutes in place of Radamel Falcao whose hat-trick contributed to Atletico's 4–1 victory.

Fenerbahçe – second spell (2013–2015)
Belözoğlu returned to Fenerbahçe on 31 January 2013 on a two-and-a-half-year contract worth €2 million per season. His first match was against Sivasspor.

İstanbul Başakşehir (2015–2019)

Belözoğlu has signed an agreement with İstanbul Başakşehir for two years before the beginning of the 2015–2016 season. Ahead of the 2018–19 campaign, he announced that he would be retiring from football at the end of the season. However he decided not to retire without playing again at Fenerbahçe, his boyhood club.

Fenerbahçe – third spell (2019–2020)
On 2 July 2019, Fenerbahçe announced the signing of Belözoğlu for a year and he retired from football after this season.

International career
After making his international debut against Norway in 2000, Belözoğlu was a regular in the Turkey national team. Injury forced him out of the Euro 2000 but he was part of the Turkish squad that finished in third place at the 2002 FIFA World Cup. Belözoğlu played the opening match of UEFA Euro 2008, but an injury sidelined him for the rest of the tournament as Turkey progressed to the semi-finals.

On 7 September 2019, Belözoğlu played his 100th match against Andorra.

Managerial career
After his retirement, on 28 October 2020, Fenerbahçe announced that Belözoğlu was appointed director of football to Fenerbahçe's first team. He led the summer transfer window of the 2020–21 season from August to October.

Fenerbahçe (interim)
On 25 March 2021, Fenerbahçe manager Erol Bulut left the team by mutual consent. Fenerbahçe board of directors and Belözoğlu agreed on an interim coaching position for 10 matchdays until the end of the season.

His first match as the club's new manager took place eleven days later, when Fenerbahçe beat Denizlispor 1–0 in a Süper Lig match, which was his very first match in his managerial career. At the end of the season, Fenerbahçe finished in third place, by 2 points behind Beşiktaş. Belözoğlu finished with a record of 7 wins, 2 draws and 1 loss in 10 matches.

On 1 June 2021, Fenerbahçe president Ali Koç announced that Belözoğlu would no longer manage Fenerbahçe after the end of the interim period. On 2 June, Fenerbahçe officially confirmed his leaving by making a farewell announcement.

İstanbul Başakşehir
On 4 October 2021, Belözoğlu signed a two-year contract to manage İstanbul Başakşehir, returning to the team he had captained for four years.

His first match as manager was a 3–2 home win over Beşiktaş on 15 October.

Style of play
A versatile midfielder, Belözoğlu was capable of playing in the middle of the pitch as a central midfielder, as an advanced playmaker, or even on the left. He was mainly known for his technical ability and tactical sense.

Personal life
Born in Turkey, Belözoğlu is of Lezgin-Circassian origin. He is a practising pious Muslim and has stated; "like everyone else (who is Muslim), I'm trying to be as moderate as possible in this holy month. But the job I do is physically very hard, so on the day of a match and for one or two days previous I don't fast".

He is fluent in Turkish, English, Italian and Spanish.

Controversy
Post-match brawl (2005)
After a post-match brawl in a 2006 World Cup qualification playoff match with Switzerland, Belözoğlu was banned for Turkey's next six matches and fined CHF 15,000 (£6,622) plus costs of CHF 1,000 (£440) for his alleged part in the brawl. The FIFA Appeal Committee later reduced the ban to four matches.

Transfer to Newcastle United (2005)
Belözoğlu's transfer from Inter Milan to Newcastle United in July 2005 is one of those about which the Stevens inquiry report in June 2007 expressed concerns.

Racial abuse accusations in England (2006)
Belözoğlu was accused of using racist insults towards Everton's Joseph Yobo, Tim Howard and Joleon Lescott during a match on 30 December 2006. He denied these claims, and he was charged by The Football Association in January 2007 and found not guilty by an independent commission in March.

In February 2007, the FA announced another investigation into alleged racist remarks from Belözoğlu, this time aimed against Bolton Wanderers striker El-Hadji Diouf in a 2–1 win at St James' Park on 15 October 2006. Emre's agent denied the accusation. Diouf subsequently decided not to press charges.

In March 2007, Belözoğlu faced a third racism allegation, from Watford defender Alhassan Bangura. He was cleared of any wrongdoing.

Racial abuse incident in Turkey (2012)
On 15 April 2012, Belözoğlu was accused of making a racist comment on the pitch towards Trabzonspor's Didier Zokora. He has denied these claims.

On 17 June 2014, Belözoğlu was sentenced to a two-and-a-half-month suspended prison sentence as a result of the claim, with the crime constituted as an insult crime. He is the first Turkish footballer to be sentenced for racism.

On 3 February 2020, Emre has been accused of racism by John Obi Mikel, whom stated "Emre swore at me and my family, I cannot accept this"

Career statistics

Club

International

Scores and results list Turkey's goal tally first, score column indicates score after each Emre goal.

Managerial record

Honours
Galatasaray
Süper Lig: 1997–98, 1998–99, 1999–2000
Turkish Cup: 1998–99, 1999–2000
Turkish Super Cup: 1997
UEFA Cup: 1999–2000
UEFA Super Cup: 2000

Inter Milan
Coppa Italia: 2004–05

Newcastle United
UEFA Intertoto Cup: 2006

Fenerbahçe
Süper Lig: 2010–11, 2013–14
Turkish Cup: 2011–12, 2012–13
Turkish Super Cup: 2009, 2014

Atlético Madrid
UEFA Super Cup: 2012

Turkey
FIFA World Cup third place: 2002
UEFA European Championship semi-final: 2008

Individual
FIFA 100
Pirata d'Oro (Inter Milan Player of the Year): 2003
Süper Lig Player of the Season: 2009–10

See also
 List of footballers with 100 or more caps

Notes

References

External links

1980 births
Living people
Footballers from Istanbul
Turkish footballers
Turkey international footballers
Turkey under-21 international footballers
Turkey youth international footballers
Turkish football managers
Turkish Muslims
Süper Lig players
Serie A players
Premier League players
La Liga players
Zeytinburnuspor footballers
Galatasaray S.K. footballers
Inter Milan players
Newcastle United F.C. players
Fenerbahçe S.K. footballers
Atlético Madrid footballers
İstanbul Başakşehir F.K. players
UEFA Cup winning players
2002 FIFA World Cup players
FIFA 100
UEFA Euro 2008 players
Turkish expatriate footballers
Turkish expatriate sportspeople in England
Turkish expatriate sportspeople in Italy
Turkish expatriate sportspeople in Spain
Expatriate footballers in England
Expatriate footballers in Italy
Expatriate footballers in Spain
Association football midfielders
FIFA Century Club
Süper Lig managers
Fenerbahçe S.K. (football) non-playing staff
İstanbul Başakşehir F.K. managers
Turkish people of Lezgian descent
Turkish people of Circassian descent
Racism in association football